Serine incorporator 5 is a protein that in humans is encoded by the SERINC5 gene.

Properties 
SERINC5 is a protein belonging to the serine incorporator (SERINC) family, in the predicted membrane proteins class. It is believed that SERINC5 proteins help incorporate serine into certain lipid bilayer membranes; however, scientists are unsure of their primary function and physiology. Of the five proteins in the human SERINC family, their topologies are strikingly similar. Approximately 17% of amino acids are shared amongst these proteins.

C-terminal Transmembrane Domain 
SERINC proteins have about 10 to 11 transmembrane domains. For SERINC5 to localize itself to the plasma membrane to inhibit infectivity by viruses, an extra c-terminal transmembrane domain is required. This extra transmembrane domain allows the protein to express itself stably.

Antagonistic Relationships 
Nef, glycoGag, and S2 viral proteins are located throughout HIV-1 virions that aid in the facilitation of retrovirus release. When present, SERINC5, in the absence of certain virulence factors, prohibits HIV retrovirus particles from fusing to the cell membrane and incorporating their genetic information into target cells. Because SERINC5 is primarily localized via the plasma membrane, and attaches to vesicles carrying virus particles, the restriction factor has the ability to greatly decrease viral infectivity in the early stages of infection. It has been observed in past experiments that the highest SERINC5 concentration, regardless the expression of Nef, decreased infectivity approximately 250-fold. Although poorly understood, it is believed that Nef is a primary cause for the destruction of SERINC5 and other restriction factors. When in the presence of virulence factors, specifically Nef, both SERINC5 and CD4 cells are downregulated through lysosomal degradation via the AP-2 endocytic pathway. This causes rapid infectivity, and an increase in viral load.

References